Sant Vicent de sa Cala is a hamlet in the northeast of the Spanish island of Ibiza. Sant Vicent de sa Cala is in the municipality of Sant Joan de Labritja and is a short distance west of the beach and holiday resort of Cala de Sant Vicent. The hamlet is on the north side of the designated road PM-811 which runs west to south between Sant Joan de Labritja and Cala de Sant Vicent.

Description
The hamlet consists of several houses around a small rural church which is reached by taking a turn off the PM 811 northwards. The Església Sant Vicent was constructed between 1827 and 1838. The church has a double arched porch and sits in front of a tiny plaza contains a solitary palm tree. The façade is very plain except for a small plaque which states that the church is the house of God and gate to heaven.

References

Populated places in Ibiza